The Hrvatica is a Croatian breed of domestic chicken.
The breed is widespread in almost all of Croatia and the Balkans. It was developed in 1917 by Ivan Lakuš, in the village of Torčec in the Podravina Province.

References

Further reading
 

Chicken breeds
Animal breeds originating in Croatia